Rancho Redondo is a district of the Goicoechea canton, in the San José province of Costa Rica.

Geography 
Rancho Redondo has an area of  km² and an elevation of  metres.

Demographics 

For the 2011 census, Rancho Redondo had a population of  inhabitants.

Transportation

Road transportation 
The district is covered by the following road routes:
 National Route 205
 National Route 218

References 

Districts of San José Province
Populated places in San José Province